The Pirate Party (PIRATAS), formerly called Pirate Party of Brazil is a political party in Brazil. Based on the model of the Swedish Pirate Party, it supports reformation of copyright law, freedom of information, and privacy.  The party was a founding member of Pirate Parties International.

The party has not yet been registered by the Brazilian Electoral Court.

History

Background 
The Pirate Party initially appeared in 2007. By the end of 2008 the party had over 300 registered members.

The Pirate Party has met at various events, such as campus party, in São Paulo, and Circo Digital, in Rio de Janeiro. The first official meeting of the party was held on March 28–29, 2009. The event, called "I Insurgência Pirata" (I pirate), brought together the party's activists to document the principals and guidelines of the party.

Foundation 
The official creation of the party took place on July 27–28, 2012, at the National Foundation Convention in Recife. Roughly 130 activists from 15 states met to discuss the foundation of the party, and on July 28 signed the founding documents.

The party's first national board, elected at the national foundation convention, was composed of three general secretaries: Alexsandro Albuquerque from Pernambuco, Kristian Pasini from Bahia, and Henrique Peer from São Paulo.

On September 2, 2013, the party's founding documents were published in the Official Journal of the Union.

On December 10, 2013, the party obtained official registration with a notary and CNPJ.

The first national convention of the Pirate Party took place between May 23 and May 25, 2014, in Curitiba, where the political and economic positions of the party were finalized. About 90 members attended the event in-person while other attended via the internet.

Ideology 
The Pirate Party's focus is on the defense of human rights, freedom of speech, and privacy. The party believes these rights are threatened by laws that ban or regulate file-exchange, knowledge sharing, and government transparency.No final, nosso objetivo como Partido Pirata não é querer vender pra você mais uma ideologia pronta, mas sim defender princípios e ideias novas (muitas nem tão novas assim) que partem desse novo paradigma que é a Internet e como ela pode inspirar um novo tipo de sociedade em rede, onde a cidadania não é apenas apertar botões em um período especifico de tempo, mas uma participação constante em assuntos locais.

Our goal as the Pirate Party is not to sell you another fake ideology, but to defend new principles and ideas (many not so new) originating from this new invention called the Internet and how it can inspire a new type of society where citizenship is not just pressing buttons in a specific period of time, but a constant participation in local affairs.—Pirate Party: left or right?

Organization 
The Pirate Party is composed of a General Secretariat, National Coordinator, National Treasurer, and a General Assembly.

References

External links
Official website

2012 establishments in Brazil
Brazil
Political parties established in 2012
Political parties in Brazil